Marcio Marcos do Carmo Miranda (born 16 July 1942) is a Brazilian chess FIDE master (FM), Brazilian Chess Championship winner (1974).

Biography
In the 1960s and 1970s Márcio Miranda was one of Brazil's leading chess players. He won two medals in Brazilian Chess Championships: gold (1974, shared 1st place with Alexandru Segal) and bronze (1966).

Márcio Miranda played for Brazil in the Chess Olympiad:
 In 1968, at first reserve board in the 18th Chess Olympiad in Lugano (+1, =2, -5).

References

External links

Márcio Miranda chess games at 365chess.com

1942 births
Living people
Chess FIDE Masters
Brazilian chess players
Chess Olympiad competitors
20th-century chess players